Teen Spirit is the debut extended play by British pop duo Bars and Melody. It was released in the United Kingdom on the 26 August 2016. The album peaked at number 49 on the UK Albums Chart and number 85 on the Irish Albums Chart.

Track listing

Charts

Weekly charts

Release history

References

2016 albums